Cyclammina is a genus of foraminifers in the family Cyclamminidae. Most species are extinct, but there are a few that are extant.

C. elegans was a species from the Cretaceous of Trinidad and from New Zealand.

See also 
 List of prehistoric foraminifera genera

References 

 Beck, R. Stanley (1943); "Eocene Foraminifera from Cowlitz River, Lewis County, Washington" Journal of Paleontology 17'(6), pages 584-614

External links 
 

 
 
 Cyclammina at the World Register of Marine Species (WoRMS)

Loftusiida
Foraminifera genera